The Boy in the River is a 2012 book by the British author and criminologist Richard Hoskins about the 'Adam' murder case.

Background
Hoskins lived in the Democratic Republic of the Congo from 1986 to 1992, initially on a gap year. He subsequently was married and had a daughter in the Congo, however his daughter died during his time in Africa. Hoskins was asked by the Metropolitan Police for advice and assistance after the discover of the body of a young African-descent child floating in the River Thames in London.

Synopsis
The book combines Hoskins' work on the case and the various leads he follows. It is believed the murder was a ritual killing. It is discovered that the victim came from Nigeria. The book also recounts Hoskins' time in the Congo.

Reception
The book was reviewed in The Economist and The Sunday Times.

BBC London had a segment on the book.

References

2012 non-fiction books
History of the River Thames
Non-fiction crime books
Books about child abuse
Books about Africa
Books about the Democratic Republic of the Congo
Pan Books books